The Monkey's Paw is a 2013 American horror film based on the 1902 short story of the same name by author W. W. Jacobs. The film revolves around Jake Tilton, who receives a mysterious monkey's-paw talisman that grants him three wishes. The film was directed by Brett Simmons, written by Macon Blair, and produced by Ross Otterman for TMP Films, and is a Chiller Films presentation.

The film was released in theaters and video on demand on October 8, 2013.

Plot 

Jake Tilton (C. J. Thomason) is a working stiff, down on his luck with an ex-wife (Olivia) he's still in love with who married his boss and a mom dying of cancer. His co-worker Tony Cobb (Stephen Lang) has problems too, with an ex-wife who takes out a restraining order so he cannot see his son. 

Jake and Tony go out drinking after work to drown their problems and Jake runs into another co-worker, Gillespie, who had been fired from their workplace that day. He shows them a monkey's paw which he claims will work magic and move a man's life around and bend fate via 3 wishes for each person who owns it. Jake rubs the paw and jokingly wishes for the cherry Plymouth GT they noticed earlier outside the bar. He tries to give it back, but Gillespie, who blames Jake for his being fired, refuses to take it back and says now it is Jake's problem.

As they leave to go home, Tony notices that not only is the GT unlocked, the keys are in the ignition and they take it for a joyride to Jake's ex-wife's (and his boss's) home. He attempts to reconcile with her but she rejects him and he and Tony go on their way.

As they speed down a back-road talking they fail to notice a gator in the road and Jake is forced to swerve at the last moment, crashing into a tree and throwing Tony through the windshield.

Jake attempts to revive Tony but he dies after saying a few words. Jake decides to use the monkey's paw to revive him, and wishes Tony alive, but when it doesn't work he sees a truck approaching, runs into panicked into the dark.

The truck turns out to be driven by a young blonde who gets out and calls for an ambulance. In the meantime, Tony has seemingly recovered, standing up and asking her "Am I still dead?" 

Jake runs among some derelict buildings, and seeing a graffiti of a trio of monkey's skulls, angrily throws the paw away.

Back at the blonde's house, she patches up the terrible wounds on Tony's face ("I can't feel nothin'") and attempts to have sex with him, but when she notices his ex-wife Abby's name tattooed on his arm and asks about her, he seems to come out of his fugue state and rejects her. He starts to leave and she confronts him about taking her hoodie and he uses it to strangle her. 

In the morning Jake rides a bus to the police station where he sits outside until he is noticed by a detective (Charles Dutton).

Tony goes to his ex-wife Abby's house where he attempts to visit his son but his wife is disturbed by the wounds on his face and calls the police about him violating the restraining order.

Later at work, no one has seen Tony and Jake calls hospitals but he has no luck finding Tony. After work, walking home he is called to by Tony in a graveyard. Among the crypts Tony guesses Jake guesses he was dead and Jake wished him back alive. Tony tells Jake he wants that 3rd wish, and Jake need not use it wishing for his ex-wife back, he guarantees she will be his soon.

That night, Jake's boss (and ex-wifes current hubby) Kevin sends his mistress home, then notices noises out in the work area. Tony confronts him and knocks him out with a wrench. When Kevin comes to, he finds he is tied up with his head under an industrial press. Tony turns it on and Kevin's head explodes. 

The next day Jake goes looking for the monkey's paw in the area he threw it, but cannot find it. He gets a call from his brother and goes to his house to have breakfast and discuss their terminal mother.

Olivia (Michelle Pierce) calls him to tell him Kevin is missing and she reveals their marriage is failing.

Together they visit a fortune teller who tells Jake she knows he has willingly entered into evil, and is responsible for the man with no soul. 

When Jake returns home, Tony is waiting for him, telling him that Olivia is now Jake's and he wants the last wish. Jake tells him he can't find it and tells Tony he has problems of his own, unable to pay his dying mother's medical bills.

Tony pays her a visit and smothers her. Jake arrives at the hospital to find his mother has died, apparently of natural causes. 

Jake realizes Tony is responsible and arranges to meet him in the graveyard that night. Tony admits to murdering Jake's mother and after Jake strikes him he beats Jake and demands he find the monkey's paw and wish his son back into his life.

Jake visits his brother Charlie (Grayson Berry) and sister-in-law Sandy (Sabrina Gennarino) and tells them the entire story, who does not believe him. They do believe Tony may be dangerous and agree to leave town for a couple days for safety and Jake goes to the police.

He talks to Detective Margolis, who noticed him earlier, telling him only that Tony has threatened him and his family. He informs Jake his boss is dead and mentions he saw Jake the other day looking depressed. He releases Jake, telling him to stay in town.

Jake visits Gillespie, who says while he never had the guts to use the paw, but his father did. A passing sailor gives it to his father and tells him the tale. Gillespie's father uses the paw to wish for money, then (like the original story) his son dies and he receives money in compensation. He hints his father may have played out the rest of the story, wishing his brother alive then dead again. He warns Jake that he cannot unwish what has happened and any more wishes are likely to only bring more trouble.

Jake visits Abby to warn her about Tony. Meanwhile, Tony visits Gillespie and murders him with a machete.

Detective Margolis figures out Tony must be responsible for the murders and sends his men out to find him. 

Jake buys a gun from his co-worker Catfish and hears Gillespie has been murdered.

Jake's brother and sister-in-law leave town, but are followed by Tony. He follows them to an abandoned warehouse after ramming their car while Jake hurries to the scene. 

Tony's physical state begins to deteriorate as he spits up blood, but he murders both Charlie and Sandy.

Detective Margolis visits Olivia to take her to a safe house to protect her, but is immediately murdered by Tony. 

Tony kidnaps Olivia and takes her to Abby's house Jake rescues her and they hear Tony assaulting Abby inside.

Jake has found the monkey's paw and goes inside to deliver it to Tony. 

Tony, bleeding from every orifice, grabs Olivia while Jake offers him the paw. Jake takes the blame for everything that has transpired and wishes Tony had his soul back.

Tony screams with pain, stabs Olivia and beats Jake nearly to death. He tries to get into the room with his son while Abby tries to stop him.

He says he just wanted to take his boy fishing, then commits suicide with Jake's gun. 

Olivia crawls painfully to Jake to ask him to hold on. He awakens in an ambulance panicking about the paw and is restrained by EMT personnel. 

The next scene is of Abby packing a truck to move. The camera zooms to show the boy with the monkey's paw.

Cast
 Stephen Lang as Tony Cobb
 C. J. Thomason as Jake Tilton
 Daniel Hugh Kelly as Gillespie
 Corbin Bleu as Catfish
 Charles S. Dutton as Detective Margolis
 Michelle Pierce as Olivia
 Tauvia Dawn as Abby

Production
The film was shot on location in New Orleans, and faced difficulties filming in the aftermath of Hurricane Katrina.

Home video
The film was released on DVD and Blu-ray by Shout! Factory on their Scream Factory label on June 17, 2014.

References

External links
 
 

2013 films
2013 horror films
American supernatural horror films
Films based on short fiction
Films based on works by W. W. Jacobs
2010s English-language films
2010s American films